The Sunwapta River is a major tributary of the Athabasca River in Jasper National Park in Alberta, Canada.

Course
The headwaters of the Sunwapta River are near the Columbia Icefield in the valley west-northwest of Sunwapta Pass, which divides Jasper National Park from Banff National Park.  Several kilometres down the valley from the pass is Sunwapta Lake, at the toe of the Athabasca Glacier, which is considered the nominal source for the river.  The Sunwapta River then continues to run northwest through Jasper National Park, following the Icefields Parkway, and finally joins the Athabasca River shortly after Sunwapta Falls.

Sunwapta is a Stoney language word meaning "turbulent river".  Geologist A. P. Coleman named the river in 1892.

Tributaries
Kitchener Creek
Tangle Creek
Woolley Creek
Beauty Creek
Diadem Creek
Grizzly Creek
Jonas Creek
Poboktan Creek

See also 
 List of rivers of Alberta

References

Jasper National Park
Rivers of Alberta